During the 2018–19 season, Real Betis participated in La Liga, Copa del Rey and UEFA Europa League.

Players

Reserve team

Out on loan

Transfers

In

Out

Pre-season and friendlies

Competitions

Overall

La Liga

League table

Results summary

Results by round

Matches

Copa del Rey

Round of 32

Round of 16

Quarter-finals

Semi-finals

UEFA Europa League

Group stage

Knockout phase

Round of 32

Statistics

Appearances and goals
Last updated on 19 May 2019.

|-
! colspan=14 style=background:#dcdcdc; text-align:center|Goalkeepers

|-
! colspan=14 style=background:#dcdcdc; text-align:center|Defenders

|-
! colspan=14 style=background:#dcdcdc; text-align:center|Midfielders

|-
! colspan=14 style=background:#dcdcdc; text-align:center|Forwards

|-
! colspan=14 style=background:#dcdcdc; text-align:center| Players who have made an appearance or had a squad number this season but have left the club either permanently or on loan
|-

|}

Goalscorers

References

Real Betis seasons
Real Betis
Real Betis